The 2013 Patriot League men's basketball tournament was held March 6, 9 and 13 at campus sites of the higher seed.  The winner of the tournament, the BucknellBison received an automatic bid to the NCAA tournament.

Bracket

External links
 2013 Patriot League Men's Basketball Championship

Patriot League men's basketball tournament
Tournament
Patriot League men's basketball tournament